Ourouër is a former commune in the Nièvre department in central France. On 1 January 2017, it was merged into the new commune Vaux d'Amognes.

Demographics
At the 2006 census, the population was 321. In 1999, the population was 332.

See also
Communes of the Nièvre department

References

Former communes of Nièvre
Populated places disestablished in 2017